Venelin Filipov (born 20 August 1990) is a Bulgarian footballer who plays as a defender for Sozopol. His brother Tsvetan is also a footballer.

Career
On 28 February 2018, Filipov signed with Etar Veliko Tarnovo for  years.  He was released after the end of the 2017–18 season. After the 2019 season he left Žalgiris. In February 2020, Filipov joined Slavia Sofia on a contract running for two seasons.

On 4 January 2021, Filipov returned to Etar where he played until the end of the season.

Honours
FC Voluntari
Romanian Cup: 2016–17
Žalgiris
Lithuanian Cup: 2018

References

External links
 
 Player Profile at Football24
 Player Profile at Sportal.bg
 
 

1990 births
Living people
Sportspeople from Burgas
Bulgarian footballers
Bulgaria under-21 international footballers
FC Pomorie players
PFC Chernomorets Burgas players
PFC Lokomotiv Plovdiv players
PFC Beroe Stara Zagora players
FC Voluntari players
SFC Etar Veliko Tarnovo players
FK Žalgiris players
PFC Slavia Sofia players
First Professional Football League (Bulgaria) players
Second Professional Football League (Bulgaria) players
Liga I players
A Lyga players
Bulgarian expatriate footballers
Bulgarian expatriate sportspeople in Romania
Bulgarian expatriate sportspeople in Lithuania
Expatriate footballers in Romania
Expatriate footballers in Lithuania
Association football fullbacks